Abramo Bartolommeo Massalongo (13 May 1824 – 25 May 1860) was an Italian paleobotanist and lichenologist. He was born in Tregnago in the Province of Verona and took a great interest in botany as a young man. Massalongo joined the faculty of medicine at the University of Padua in 1844. Along with Gustav Wilhelm Körber, he founded the "Italian-Silesian" school of lichenology. He also collaborated with Martino Anzi. He was the husband of Maria Colognato and the father of hepaticologist Caro Benigno Massalongo.
He also worked in the scientific field of herpetology.  In 1859 his Catalogo dei rettili delle province venete was published in Venice.

Massalongo died in Verona in 1860.

He was honoured in 1855, when German lichenologist Gustav Wilhelm Körber circumscribed Massalongia which is a genus of lichen-forming fungi in the family Massalongiaceae.

See also
 :Category talk:Taxa named by Abramo Bartolommeo Massalongo

References

External links
 View works by Abramo Bartolommeo Massalongo at Biodiversity Heritage Library.

1824 births
1860 deaths
19th-century Italian botanists
Italian lichenologists
Paleobotanists
Scientists from Verona
University of Padua alumni